Perithous is a genus of parasitoid wasps belonging to the family Ichneumonidae.

The species of this genus are found in Europe and North America.

Species
The following species are recognised in the genus Perithous:
 Perithous albicinctus (Gravenhorst, 1829) 
 Perithous changbaishanus (He, 1996) 
 Perithous digitalis Gupta, 1982
 Perithous divinator (Rossi, 1790)
 Perithous galbus Baltazar, 1961
 Perithous guizhouensis He, 1996
 Perithous kamathi Gupta, 1982
 Perithous nigrigaster Constantineanu & Constantineanu, 1968
 Perithous romanicus Constantineanu & Constantineanu, 1968
 Perithous rufimesothorax (He, 1996)
 Perithous scurra (Panzer, 1804)
 Perithous septemcinctorius (Thunberg, 1822)
 Perithous speculator Haupt, 1954
 Perithous sundaicus Gupta, 1982
 Perithous townesorum (Gupta, 1982)
 Perithous transversus Constantineanu & Constantineanu, 1968
 Perithous virgulatus Baltazar, 1961
 BOLD:AAI2531 (Perithous sp.)
 BOLD:ACO3734 (Perithous sp.)
 BOLD:ACP6162 (Perithous sp.)

References

Ichneumonidae
Ichneumonidae genera